Jacques ("Jacky") Stockman (8 October 1938 – 4 May 2013) was a Belgian football player. He played most of his career for R.S.C. Anderlecht and was selected 32 times for Belgium. He played in the Belgium-Netherlands match in 1964 with 10 fellows from the Anderlecht team after the substitution of goalkeeper Guy Delhasse by Jean-Marie Trappeniers. Stockman was nicknamed Zorro after he scored a late goal with Anderlecht against Bologna FC in the second leg of the 1964–65 European Cup first round, enforcing a replay at the Camp Nou. The song "Zorro est arrivé" by French singer Henri Salvador was popular at the time.

He played a total of 32 matches for Belgium, scoring 13 goals.

He was top scorer of the Belgian first division in 1961–62.

He died on 4 May 2013.

Honours

Individual 

 Belgian First Division top scorer: 1961-62 (29 goals)

References

External links
 
 

1938 births
2013 deaths
Belgian footballers
Belgian football managers
R.S.C. Anderlecht players
RFC Liège players
Belgium international footballers
Belgian Pro League players
Royal Excel Mouscron managers
K.M.S.K. Deinze managers
Association football forwards
People from Ronse
Footballers from East Flanders